Red Robin is an American restaurant chain. The title may also refer to:

Flora and fauna
American robin (Turdus migratorius), a common species of bird
 Geranium robertianum (herb-Robert), a plant species
 Silene chalcedonica (nonesuch), a plant species
Red Robin (Photinia x fraseri), a popular cultivar of the small tree and large shrub genus Photinia

Comics
 Red Robin (comic book), the ongoing monthly comic featuring the pre-Flashpoint incarnation of Red Robin
Red Robin (identity), several characters in the DC Comics universe

Music
Red Robin Records, record label
"When the Red, Red Robin (Comes Bob, Bob, Bobbin' Along)", a song